Eleutherodactylus pallidus is a species of frog in the family Eleutherodactylidae.
It is endemic to Mexico.
Its natural habitats are subtropical or tropical dry forests and subtropical or tropical dry shrubland.
It is threatened by habitat loss.

References

pallidus
Amphibians described in 1968
Taxonomy articles created by Polbot